John Caparulo (born September 22, 1975) is an American stand-up comedian.

Early life
Caparulo grew up in East Liverpool, Ohio and graduated from Kent State in 1998. Caparulo started his stand-up career in night clubs in Cleveland, Ohio and Pittsburgh in 1997. He then spent several years working as a doorman at the Comedy Store in Hollywood, California and as a groundskeeper at a local golf course.

Career
Caparulo first appeared at the 2003 Just for Laughs festival in Montreal, where he was offered a sitcom, and a spot on The Late Late Show with Craig Kilborn. He has since appeared on The Tonight Show, was featured on Blue Collar Comedy Tour: The Next Generation hosted by Bill Engvall, and was one of the comedians documented on Vince Vaughn's Wild West Comedy Tour. He hosted Mobile Home Disaster on CMT, and played the part of 'Brian' on the short-lived ABC sitcom Work It. He also has a comedy special that aired on Comedy Central on December 21, 2008 called John Caparulo: Meet Cap which was directed by Dave Higby. The special was released on CD on February 10, 2009 and on DVD on April 14, 2009. Caparulo intermittently hosts The Mad Cap Hour radio show with his wife Jamie Caparulo and comedian Mark Ellis on Sirius XM, toadhopnetwork.com, and iTunes.

Caparulo regularly appeared on the E! show Chelsea Lately during its 7-year run. He voices the character Headphone Joe on Disney's Fish Hooks.

Caparulo released his second album titled Come Inside Me in August 2013 on Netflix. In February 2014, Cap began releasing Caplets, a brand-new set of comedy every 30 days that he shoots at the Comedy and Magic Club in Hermosa Beach, California and The Ice House in Pasadena, CA, and distributes them on his website for free.

Since 2014, Cap has been writing and developing an animated series called “Cartoon Comic,” based on his life as a comedian, husband, and father. Cap has written a comic book series under the same title and has independently produced several animated standup shorts for his website and YouTube.

In 2018, Caesars Entertainment offered Caparulo a weekly residency show. He consistently performs "John Caparulo's Mad Cap Comedy" five nights a week at Harrah's Las Vegas.

Personal life
On the November 4th, 2010 episode of Chelsea Lately, John announced that he proposed to Jamie Marie Kelly after his October 29 performance at the Comedy & Magic Club in Hermosa Beach, California. John and Jamie were wed at Water Street Tavern near their alma mater, Kent State University, on May 27, 2012. The couple currently resides in Calabasas, California and Las Vegas, Nevada with their three dogs, a basset hound, a puggle, and a rescued collie mix. On their October 10, 2014, #26 Domestic Disputes podcast Jamie reveals to John that they are having a child. On November 27, 2014 #28 of their podcast they reveal that their child is going to be a girl and that they are going to name her Madden Jae. They welcomed Madden Jae on May 22, 2015.

Discography

Television appearances

Filmography

See also
 List of comedians
 List of stand-up comedians

References

External links
 
 

1975 births
Living people
American stand-up comedians
Kent State University alumni
People from East Liverpool, Ohio
Warner Records artists
Comedians from Ohio
20th-century American comedians
21st-century American comedians